Sand Ridge Township is one of sixteen townships in Jackson County, Illinois, USA.  As of the 2010 census, its population was 816 and it contained 354 housing units.

Geography

Cities, towns, villages
 Gorham

Unincorporated towns
 Grimsby at 
 Sand Ridge at 
(This list is based on USGS data and may include former settlements.)

Adjacent townships
 Levan Township (north)
 Somerset Township (northeast)
 Murphysboro Township (east)
 Pomona Township (southeast)
 Grand Tower Township (south)
 Fountain Bluff Township (west)
 Kinkaid Township (northwest)

Cemeteries
The township contains Creath Morris Cemetery.

I believe that the location of the Creath Morris Cemetery is just above the old Grimsby Illinois Elementary School.  As a child I lived on the lane that is now called Sarensen.  We used to play over on that hill above the school.  I don't believe any of the markers are still there because the weather has badly eroded the steep slope.  Melissa Janean [Reames] Holt  - Note added 2017

Major highways
  Illinois Route 3
  Illinois Route 149

Landmarks
 Lake Murphysboro State Park (southwest edge)
Kincaid Spillway
https://www.dnr.illinois.gov/Parks/Pages/KinkaidLake.aspx

Notable Persons

https://en.wikipedia.org/wiki/Gary_Geiger

Demographics

School districts
 Murphysboro Community Unit School District 166
 Trico Community Unit School District 176

Political districts
 Illinois' 12th congressional district
 State House District 115
 State Senate District 58

References
 
 United States Census Bureau 2007 TIGER/Line Shapefiles
 United States National Atlas

External links
 City-Data.com
 Illinois State Archives

Townships in Jackson County, Illinois
Townships in Illinois